The Bank Hall Estate is the demesne of the Jacobean mansion house of Bank Hall, including much of land around the village of Bretherton, which is owned by the Lilford Trust.

History
The Estate began when the Banastre family moved to Lancashire from Prestatyn, North Wales in 1240. The estate covers many acres of land that surround a Jacobean hall constructed by the family in 1608 (on the site of a much older building), situated to the west of the village of Bretherton. The Banastre's Estate and wealth grew from farming and leasing land, which continues to this very day with the current management.

Management and Ownership

Bretherton Village
The present Bretherton includes the ancient village of Thorp, the position of which appears to have left no trace.
Bretherton village for most of its existence was an almost self-supporting, self-contained 'subsistence agrarian economy'. Major changes to the village have occurred within living memory; well-paid employment opportunities coupled with rationalisation of farming facilitated people to escape their low income agrarian lifestyle and move to local urban centres. Since then the village has become a dormitory village, with the majority of the residential properties now owned by their residents, but some are still leased from the estates. As the decline in British farming affected the village population and agricultural industry, many of the farms and barns have been converted into residential properties attracting wealth.

Key

Features
Features within the Bank Hall Estate range from listed buildings and gardens to natural geographic features.

Future Development
In February 2011 planning permission was granted for Bank Hall Action Group and Urban Splash to restore the mansion house, and its surrounding 18 acres of gardens and walled garden/ greenhouse area into residential dwellings with a heritage garden, visitor centre and tearoom. To enable the project to succeed there is a need to build enabling development on the old orchard site next to the Bank Hall walled garden, therefore reducing the impact on the historic building and gardens.
The plans will include a refurbishment to the access road to Bank Hall, with traditional estate fencing and walls re-constructed and the re-planting of hedges and trees to prevent further visual impact to the local area and wildlife.

See also
Bank Hall
Bank Hall Action Group
Bank Hall Gardens
Carr House
Bretherton

References

Bank Hall
Listed buildings in Lancashire
Windmills in Lancashire
Parks and open spaces in Lancashire
Grade II listed buildings in Lancashire